Stephen Anderson (born 17 January 1968) is a former Australian rules footballer who played with Collingwood in the Australian Football League (AFL) and Central District on the South Australian Football League (SANFL).

Anderson was recruited by Collingwood from South Warrnambool in the Midyear Draft, during their premiership winning 1990 AFL season. He did not feature in any senior games for Collingwood that year but made four appearances in 1991. On his AFL debut, against Fitzroy at Victoria Park, Anderson had 24 disposals and a goal.

He won the 1991 Gardiner Medal, for his reserves performances.

References

1968 births
Australian rules footballers from Victoria (Australia)
Collingwood Football Club players
Central District Football Club players
South Warrnambool Football Club players
Living people